The Brocon Pass (1616 m) is a high mountain pass in the Dolomites in the Eastern part of Trentino in Italy. The approach road from the south actually reaches 1663 metres altitude, before gently descending to the col itself.

It connects the Vanoi valley with the Tesino plateau, linking Castello Tesino and Canal San Bovo.

The pass road was built between 1905 and 1908.

See also
 List of highest paved roads in Europe
 List of mountain passes

Brocon